Aaron Connolly may refer to:

 Aaron Connolly (Irish footballer) (born 2000), plays for Brighton and Ireland 
 Aaron Connolly (Scottish footballer) (born 1991), plays for Ayr United